The Davis Carriage House is a single family home (originally constructed as a carriage house) located at 519 N. Fayette in Saginaw, Michigan. It was listed on the National Register of Historic Places in 1982.

History
Charles H. Davis  was born in Massachusetts, and as a young man, moved the Saginaw in 1869. There, he took a job as a stockyard worker in one of timber magnate Ammi W. Wright's mills. Wright noticed Davis, and soon promoted him to bookkeeper and then mill manager. Eventually, Davis bought into the form, changing its name to the Wright and Davis Sawmill. From there, Davis expanded his business interests into banking, railroading, and other lumber activities throughout Michigan and Minnesota. In 1887, Davis built a mansion on Michigan Avenue, which included a carriage house that was at the time located behind the main house, which provided space for vehicles as well as a servant's quarters.

Davis's mansion was eventually demolished to construct what is now the Covenant Healthcare Hospital, but the carriage house remained. In 1934, Saginaw architects James A. Spence, Sr. and Robert B. Franz redesigned the interior to convert it into a single family home, without changing the exterior.

Description
The Davis Carriage House is a Queen Anne structure, and contains Queen Anne design elements such as corbeled brick ornamentation, gables, dormers, and bay windows. The design is reminiscent of an English country cottage, exemplified by windows leaded with diamond shaped panes, a red roman tile roof, a white-washed stone fence with a black iron grid. It is complemented by surrounding landscaping containing ivy, trees, and bushes.

References

		
National Register of Historic Places in Saginaw County, Michigan
Queen Anne architecture in Michigan
Buildings and structures completed in 1887